The 1987 Belgian Grand Prix was a Formula One motor race held on 17 May 1987 at the Circuit de Spa-Francorchamps, Francorchamps, Wallonia. Contested over 43 laps, the race was the 45th Belgian Grand Prix, the 33rd to be held at Spa and the fourth since the circuit was redeveloped in 1979, and the third race of the 1987 Formula One season.

The race was won by France's Alain Prost driving a McLaren-TAG. This was Prost's second victory of the 1987 season and his second in the Belgian Grand Prix (after 1983), as well as his 27th Grand Prix victory overall, equalling Jackie Stewart's all-time record. Prost's Swedish team-mate Stefan Johansson finished second, the only other driver on the same lap, giving McLaren their first 1-2 finish since the previous year's Monaco Grand Prix. Italy's Andrea de Cesaris, driving a Brabham-BMW, finished third despite having to push his car over the line as he had run out of fuel.

The win gave Prost a five-point lead over Johansson in the Drivers' Championship. Williams driver Nigel Mansell was three points further back; a first-lap collision with Ayrton Senna's Lotus had ultimately led to his retirement from the race, after which he angrily confronted the Brazilian driver in the Lotus garage.

Race summary
Qualifying runs saw the two Williams FW11Bs take the front row, with Nigel Mansell on the pole, nearly 1.5 seconds faster than Nelson Piquet. Certainly, Piquet was still suffering the results of his accident at Imola. Ayrton Senna took the third place in his Lotus 99T ahead of the two Ferrari F1/87s of Gerhard Berger and Michele Alboreto.

The race required two starts. On the first start Mansell took the lead ahead of Senna, Piquet and Alboreto. At the back of the grid René Arnoux (Ligier JS29B) and Andrea de Cesaris (Brabham BT56) tangled, whilst Thierry Boutsen (Benetton B187) hit Berger's spinning Ferrari F1/87. A more serious accident befell Philippe Streiff who crashed heavily at the Eau Rouge before the wreckage was hit by Tyrrell teammate Jonathan Palmer; both were unhurt but their Tyrrell DG016s were reduced to scrap. By virtue of qualifying 23rd to his teammate's 24th, and ironically by crashing first, Streiff was given the spare car for the restart forcing Palmer out of the race.

On the second start, Senna led Mansell away, but during lap one the Briton tried to overtake the Brazilian. The two controversially tangled, leading to the retirement of the Lotus 99T. Mansell rejoined the race at the back, until the damage sustained in the collision finally forced him to retire on lap 17. Mansell subsequently visited the Lotus garage where harsh words were exchanged and punches were thrown.

Berger retired on lap three with a broken piston whilst on lap 10 second place Michele Alboreto's wheel bearing broke and Nelson Piquet retired with a broken turbo pipe, handing the lead to Alain Prost from Teo Fabi and Stefan Johansson. The pitstops changed little in the situation, and he maintained this to win easily by 25 seconds, despite concerns with his fuel consumption due to a faulty gauge.

This was Prost's 27th win, equalling Jackie Stewart's record with team-mate Johansson making it a McLaren 1-2. Andrea de Cesaris drove superbly to finish third for Brabham despite having to push his car over the line with Eddie Cheever (Arrows A10), Satoru Nakajima (Lotus 99T) and Arnoux taking the remaining points. With the setbacks to the Tyrrell drivers, the Jim Clark points were won by the Lola LC87 of Philippe Alliot.

Classification

Qualifying

Race 
Numbers in brackets refer to positions of normally aspirated entrants competing for the Jim Clark Trophy.

Championship standings after the race

Drivers' Championship standings

Constructors' Championship standings

Jim Clark Trophy standings

Colin Chapman trophy standings

 Note: Only the top five positions are included for all four sets of standings.

References

Belgian Grand Prix
Grand Prix
Belgian Grand Prix